This is a list of members of the second Western Cape Provincial Parliament, which was elected on 2 June 1999 and expired on 14 April 2004.

See also
 List of members of the 3rd Western Cape Provincial Parliament

Members of the Western Cape Provincial Parliament